Masanosuke (written: 雅之助 or 政之輔) is a masculine Japanese given name. Notable people with the name include:

, Japanese tennis player
, Japanese communist

Japanese masculine given names